The Henry L. Alder Award for Distinguished Teaching is a national award established in 2003 by the Mathematical Association of America. The award is presented to beginning college or university mathematics faculty members to recognize success and effectiveness in undergraduate mathematics education, as well as an impact that extends beyond the faculty member's own classroom. Up to three college or university teachers are recognized each year, receiving a $1,000 award and a certificate of recognition from the MAA.

Award recipients 

2020
Selenne Bañuelos, California State University Channel Islands
Kenneth Monks, Front Range Community College- Boulder County Campus
Brandy Wiegers, Central Washington University

2019
PJ Couch, Lamar University
Pamela E. Harris, Williams College
Alicia Prieto Langarica, Youngstown State University

2018
Chad Awtrey, Elon University
David Clark, Grand Valley State University
Mohamed Omar, Harvey Mudd College

2017
Steven Klee, Seattle University
Mary Beisiegel, Oregon State University

2016
Dandrielle Lewis, University of Wisconsin-Eau Claire
Jana Gevertz, College of New Jersey
Benjamin Galluzzo, Shippensburg University

2015
Allison Henrich, Seattle University
Patrick Rault, State University of New York at Geneseo
Talithia Williams, Harvey Mudd College

2014
Dominic Klyve, Central Washington University
Lara Pudwell, Valparaiso University

2013
Kumer Das, Lamar University
Christopher Storm, Adelphi University
Rachel Levy, Harvey Mudd College

2012
Kathryn Leonard, California State University Channel Islands
Susan Martonosi, Harvey Mudd College
Michael Posner, Villanova University

2011
Alissa S. Crans, Loyola Marymount University
Sarah Eichhorn, University of California, Irvine
Sam Vandervelde, St. Lawrence University

2010
Nathan Carter, Bentley University
Kathleen Fowler, Clarkson University

2009
Scott Annin, California State University at Fullerton
Sommer Gentry, The United States Naval Academy
Jennifer McLoud-Mann, University of Texas at Tyler

2008
David Brown, Ithaca College
Jacqueline Jensen-Vallin, Sam Houston State University
Katherine Socha, St. Mary's College of Maryland

2007
Timothy Chartier, Davidson College
Satyan Devadoss, Williams College
Darren Narayan, Rochester Institute of Technology

2006
Lesley Ward, Harvey Mudd College
Garikai Campbell, Swarthmore College
Christopher N. Swanson, Ashland University

2005
Matthew DeLong, Taylor University
Sarah J. Greenwald, Appalachian State University
Laura Taalman, James Madison University

2004
Francis Edward Su, Harvey Mudd College
Zvezdelina Stankova, Mills College

References 

Awards of the Mathematical Association of America
Mathematics education in the United States
American education awards
Teacher awards